The Canton Citizens were a minor league baseball team based in Canton, Illinois in 1952. The franchise relocated from Vincennes, Indiana, during the 1952 season. The Canton Citizens played as members of the Class D level Mississippi–Ohio Valley League, predecessor to the Midwest League, before the franchise disbanded after the 1952 season. Canton hosted 1952 home games at Athletic Park.

History
Preceded in Canton by the Canton Chinks, the "Canton Citizens" came into existence during the 1952 season. On June 7, 1952, the Vincennes Velvets of the Class D level Mississippi–Ohio Valley League moved to Canton with a 15–15 record. The Canton Chinks had preceded the Canton Citizens decades earlier, playing from 1908 to 1913. The 1952 Canton team is also reported to as being called the "Aces" in some references.

The Vincennes/Canton team finished in 6th place in the eight–team league, playing under managers Chuck Hawley and Bob Sisk. With an overall record of 54–70, the Vincennes/Canton team finished 31.5 games behind the 1st place Danville Dans in the final standings. Canton permanently folded following the 1952 season, as the 1953 Mississippi–Ohio Valley League reduced to six teams.

Canton players Edward Gilde hit .303 with 90 RBI and McPherson Crum had 12 wins and 119 strikeouts to lead the team in 1952.

Canton, Illinois has not hosted another minor league team.

The ballpark
The 1952 Canton Citizens played home games at Canton Athletic Park. The Canton Athletic Park is still in use and is located at 900 First Avenue Canton, Illinois.

Timeline

Year–by–year records

Notable alumni
Chuck Hawley (1592, MGR)

References

External links
Baseball Reference

Defunct Midwest League teams
Defunct baseball teams in Illinois
Canton, Illinois
1952 establishments in Illinois
1952 disestablishments in Illinois
Baseball teams established in 1952
Baseball teams disestablished in 1952
Mississippi-Ohio Valley League
Defunct minor league baseball teams